Lambda Muscae, Latinized from λ Muscae, and often catalogued HD 102249 or HIP 57363, is the fourth-brightest star in the Southern Hemisphere constellation of Musca (the Fly). Lambda Muscae visibly makes up the far end of the tail of the visual Musca constellation. It is a star in a dual system according to studies, and one of the stars catalogued in astronomer Johann Bayer's 1603 publications Uranometria. Lambda Muscae more recently has been recorded as having a stellar classification of A7III. Thus, Lambda Muscae has a white tint and burns significantly hotter than the Sun.

Distance and visibility

Based on research done by the European Space Agency for the Hipparcos Star Catalogue, Lambda Muscae exhibits a parallax of 25.42 milliarcseconds. With this data it can be calculated that Lambda Muscae is situated at a distance of 39.3 parsecs, or 128.0 light years, away from the sun.

Lambda Muscae is a star of the third magnitude (or 3.68(v) to be exact) when viewed from the Earth, and is visible to the naked eye in regions that lack dense light pollution.

Lambda Muscae is the farthest right star in the visual constellation of Musca and is thus the tail of the fly.

Stellar characteristics

Lambda Muscae has a listed spectral type of A7V. The A7 portion of this designation that Lambda Muscae is a class A7 star, meaning the light it emits is bluish-white in color and burns at a temperature significantly hotter than the sun, which is a G2 star. A7 stars are on the larger end of the Harvard spectral classification list, being only smaller and dimmer than Class-O and Class-B stars.

References

A-type main-sequence stars
Musca (constellation)
Musca, Lambda
Durchmusterung objects
102249
057363
4520